Vera Palmer may refer to:

 Jayne Mansfield, real name Vera Palmer, actress
Vera Palmer (athlete) in 1926 Women's World Games